Sela pri Kamniku is a small settlement in the Municipality of Kamnik in the Upper Carniola region of Slovenia.

Church

The parish church, dedicated to Saint Agnes, was first mentioned in documents from 1232 and was Romanesque in its origins, although it has been frequently rebuilt and expanded, most recently in 1860.

Trivia
The sculpture was relocated to Moravče in December 2019 and destroyed in an arson attack in January 2020.

References

External links

Sela pri Kamniku on Geopedia

Populated places in the Municipality of Kamnik